Girl Interrupted is the only studio album by hip-hop recording artist Ms. Jade, release by Interscope Records on November 5, 2002. The album was produced primarily by Timbaland with other contributions by The Neptunes, Joe Staxx, Don & Jay and Maurice Wilcher. On the album, Ching Ching is the edited version despite the album's parental advisory sign. An Explicit version was recorded and can be found on the promotional vinyl single, or the official vinyl single.

Critical reception

Allmusic gave the album a two and a half out of five stars and said that Ms. Jade "benefits from Timbaland's signature, laid-back beats." Miles Lewis of Blender compared Ms. Jade to fellow Philadelphia rapper Eve. He also wrote that the song "Ching Ching" (featuring Nelly Furtado) is "contagious" and praises Timbaland's "expert production".

Track listing

Charts

References

2002 debut albums
Albums produced by the Neptunes
Albums produced by Timbaland
Interscope Records albums